Saadatabad is the former name of Saadat Shahr, a city in Fars Province, Iran.

Saadatabad may also refer to:

Fars Province
 Saadatabad, Abadeh, a village in Abadeh County
 Saadatabad, Arsanjan, a village in Arsanjan County
 Saadatabad, Darab, a village in Darab County
 Saadatabad, Firuzabad, a village in Firuzabad County
 Saadatabad, Mamasani, a village in Mamasani County
 Saadatabad, Marvdasht, a village in Marvdasht County
 Saadatabad-e Olya, a village in Marvdasht County
 Saadatabad-e Sofla, a village in Marvdasht County
 Saadatabad-e Vasat, a village in Marvdasht County
 Saadatabad, Sarvestan, a village in Sarvestan County
 Saadatabad, Sepidan, a village in Sepidan County
 Saadatabad, Shiraz, a village in Shiraz County

Hormozgan Province
 Saadatabad, Hormozgan

Isfahan Province
 Saadatabad, Isfahan, a village in Isfahan County
 Saadatabad, Semirom, a village in Semirom County
 Saadatabad, Padena-ye Sofla, a village in Semirom County
 Saadatabad, Padena-ye Vosta, a village in Semirom County

Kerman Province
 Saadatabad, Kerman
 Saadatabad, Bardsir, Kerman Province
 Saadatabad, Golbaf, Kerman County, Kerman Province
 Saadatabad, Narmashir, Kerman Province
 Saadatabad-e Golshan, Narmashir County, Kerman Province
 Saadatabad, Rafsanjan, Kerman Province
 Saadatabad, Sirjan, Kerman Province
 Saadatabad Rural District, in Kerman Province

Khuzestan Province
 Saadatabad, Khuzestan

Kohgiluyeh and Boyer-Ahmad Province
 Saadatabad, Kohgiluyeh and Boyer-Ahmad
 Saadatabad-e Lishtar, Kohgiluyeh and Boyer-Ahmad Province

Markazi Province
 Saadatabad, Markazi

Mazandaran Province
 Saadatabad, Mazandaran

Razavi Khorasan Province
 Saadatabad, Rashtkhvar, Razavi Khorasan Province

South Khorasan Province

Tehran Province
 Sa'adat Abad, neighbourhood of Tehran

Yazd Province

See also
 Sadatabad (disambiguation)